Edward Bove (b ca. 1947) is an American pediatric cardiac surgeon who has worked in the University of Michigan Health System most of his career.

Bove was raised in New York City. He earned his undergraduate degree at the College of the Holy Cross, earned his medical degree from Albany Medical College in 1972, and went to University of Michigan for his residency. He completed that in 1980, then after a sojourn at Great Ormond Street Hospital as a fellow, spent five years as a surgeon at State University of New York in Syracuse before being recruited back to Michigan in 1985 to become head of the pediatric cardiac surgery division.

According to the University of Michigan, he pioneered a surgical approach to treating hypoplastic left heart syndrome, a birth defect that was always fatal; his approach was controversial at first but since then has become widely adopted.

In 2006 Bove, who was a director of the American Board of Thoracic Surgery, was appointed by the board to chair a committee to develop written and oral examinations and application process for a new certificate program in congenital heart surgery.

By 2012 he had performed 10,000 heart surgeries at Michigan mostly on babies, and that year he was also appointed chair of a newly created department of cardiac surgery at Michigan.

References 

Year of birth missing (living people)
Living people
American medical researchers
American cardiac surgeons
Physicians from New York City
University of Michigan faculty
Albany Medical College alumni
College of the Holy Cross alumni